Fellowship is an unincorporated community located within Mount Laurel Township, in Burlington County, New Jersey, United States. The community of Fellowship was originally settled by a Quaker named George Roberts. Fellowship was the most developed of the settlements that comprised Mount Laurel. The community had included two general stores, a wagon shop, a shoe shop, a blacksmith shop, mechanics shops and a boarding school. Today, the community of Fellowship is surrounded by several business establishments and residential subdivisions.

Transportation
Route 73 is a major state highway that travels through Fellowship. In addition, the New Jersey Turnpike and Interstate 295 run through Fellowship. Both highways provide access to the community.

New Jersey Transit provides local bus service on the 457 route.

References

Mount Laurel, New Jersey
Unincorporated communities in Burlington County, New Jersey
Unincorporated communities in New Jersey